The 1922 California Golden Bears football team was an American football team that represented the University of California, Berkeley in the Pacific Coast Conference (PCC) during the 1922 college football season. In their seventh year under head coach Andy Smith, the team compiled a 9–0 record (4–0 against PCC opponents), won the PCC championship, and outscored its opponents by a combined total of 398 to 34. The 398 points scored led major college football. 

There was no contemporaneous system in 1921 for determining a national champion. However, California was retroactively named as the national champion for 1922 by the Billingsley Report (using its alternative "margin of victory" methodology) and Houlgate System, and as a co-national champion by the National Championship Foundation and Jeff Sagarin.

California end Harold "Brick" Muller was a consensus first-team selection to the 1922 All-America college football team. Additionally, Cal took eight of eleven spots on the United Press' 1922 All-Pacific Coast football team: quarterback Charles F. Erb; halfback Donald Nichols; fullback Jesse B. Morrison; ends Harold Muller and Robert A. Berkey; tackle Stewart A. Beam; and guards Webster V. Clark and Leo Calland. A ninth Cal player, center Prink Callison, was named to the All-Pacific Coast team by George Bertz.

Schedule

References

California
California Golden Bears football seasons
College football national champions
Pac-12 Conference football champion seasons
College football undefeated seasons
California Golden Bears football